Ong Kok Hai (born 1945 in Penang) is a Malaysian microbiologist and Professor of Microbiology at the International Medical University. He was one of the founders of the International Medical University in 1992 and also played a major role in the establishment of the medical schools at the University of Science, Malaysia in 1979 and at the National University of Malaysia. He has been involved in typhoid research, and in 1995 he co-founded the medical biotechnology company Malaysian Bio-Diagnostics Research Sdn Bhd (MBDr), which develops a rapid diagnostic test for typhoid fever used in many typhoid endemic countries.

He holds a BSc (Hons) in microbiology from the University of Guelph in Canada (1969) and a PhD in medical microbiology from the University of Manchester in the United Kingdom (1977). He lectured at the National University of Malaysia from 1977, before joining the University of Science to start its medical school in 1979.

His current research focuses on enteric fever and on a rapid antigen detection test for brugia malayi.

Honours
Honorary Member of Malaysian Invention and Design Society (2013)

References

Academic staff of the International Medical University
Academic staff of the National University of Malaysia
Malaysian microbiologists
1945 births
Living people